Orazly Annageldyev (born 1960) is a Chess Grandmaster from Turkmenistan.

References 

Chess grandmasters
Turkmenistan chess players
1960 births
Living people